Big Oak-Little Oak Islands is located along an old shoreline of Lake Pontchartrain in or near the Bayou Sauvage National Wildlife Refuge within the city limits of New Orleans, Louisiana.  It is a pre-Columbian site of the Tchefuncte culture, with earth and shell middens, dating from about 2470–2150 B.P.
It was added to the National Register of Historic Places on July 14, 1971.

References

 

Shell middens in the United States
Native American history of Louisiana
Archaeological sites on the National Register of Historic Places in Louisiana
Geography of New Orleans
National Register of Historic Places in New Orleans